The Nicaragua men's national under-18 basketball team is a national basketball team of Nicaragua, managed by the Federación Nicaraguense de Baloncesto.

It represents the country in international under-18 (under age 18) basketball competitions.

It appeared at the Centrobasket U18 Championship for Men.

See also
Nicaragua men's national basketball team
Nicaragua men's national under-17 basketball team
Nicaragua women's national under-19 basketball team

References

External links
Archived records of Nicaragua team participations

Basketball teams in Nicaragua
Men's national under-18 basketball teams
Basketball